WBCB may refer to:

 WBCB (AM), a radio station (1490 AM) licensed to Levittown, Pennsylvania, United States
 WBCB (The CW Plus), a digital sub-channel of WFMJ-TV in Youngstown, Ohio, which uses the false callsign WBCB